Points West is a 1929 American silent Western film directed by Arthur Rosson and starring Hoot Gibson. It was produced and distributed by Universal Pictures.

Cast
 Hoot Gibson - Cole Lawson, Jr.
 Alberta Vaughn - Dorothy
 Frank Campeau - McQuade
 Jack Raymond - His Nibs
 Martha Franklin - The Mother
 Milt Brown - Parsons
 Jim Corey - Steve

Preservation status
 A print survives but no archive is stipulated at the Library of Congress/FIAF database.

References

External links
  Points West at IMDb.com
 

1929 films
Films directed by Arthur Rosson
Universal Pictures films
1929 Western (genre) films
American black-and-white films
Silent American Western (genre) films
1920s American films
1920s English-language films